This is a list of women artists who were born in Hungary or whose artworks are closely associated with that country.

A
Rita Ackermann (born 1968), Hungarian-American painter
Margit Anna (1913–1991), painter
Lili Árkayné Sztehló (1897–1959), painter, stained glass artist

B
Suzanne Balkanyi (1922–2005), Hungarian-born French painter, etcher
Júlia Báthory (1901–2000), glass designer
Éva Bednay (1927–2017), painter, textile artist
Lilla Bodor (born 1979), painter
Ritta Boemm (1868–1948), painter

C
Marianne Csaky (active since 1990s), writer, sculptor

D
Tissa David (1921–2012), pioneering female animator
Adrienn Henczné Deák (1890–1956), painter
Dora de Pedery-Hunt (1913–2008), Hungarian-Canadian sculptor, medallist
Valéria Dénes (1877–1915), Cubist painter
Orshi Drozdik (born 1946), Hungarian-American installation artist

F
Éva Farkas (born 1960), tapestry artist
Rose Feller (born 1975), multimedia artist
Magda Frank (1914–2010), sculptor

G
Ilka Gedő (1921–1985), painter, graphic artist
Jolan Gross-Bettelheim (1900–1972), painter, graphic artist
Margit Gréczi (born 1941), painter
Gitta Gyenes (1888–1960), porcelain painter

H
Vera Harsányi (1919–1994), swimmer, painter

K
Judith Karasz (1912–1977), photographer
Dóra Keresztes (born 1953), painter, illustrator, graphic artist, animator
Ilona Keserü Ilona (born 1933), painter, educator
Katalin Keserü (born 1946), artist, educator
Edith Kiss (1905–1966), sculptor, painter
Margit Kovács (1902–1977), ceramist, sculptor
Elza Kövesházi-Kalmár, sculptor 
Ilona Kronstein (1897–1948), painter

L
Katalin Ladik (born 1942), poet, performance artist, actress
Klára Lenz (1924–2013), tapestry artist
Vilma Lwoff-Parlaghy (1863–1923), portrait painter

M
Eszter Mattioni (1902–1993), painter
Dóra Maurer (born 1937), multidisciplinary artist
Vera Molnár (born 1924), pioneering Hungarian-born French computer artist
Zsuzsa Mathe (born 1964), painter

O
Lili Ország (1926–1978), painter

P
Marta Pan, (1923–2008), Hungarian-born French sculptor

R
Zsuzsi Roboz (1929–2012), painter
Lívia Rusz (1930–2020), graphic artist, illustrator

S
Erzsébet Schaár (1905–1975), sculptor
Marianna Schmidt (1918–2005), Hungarian-Canadian printmaker, painter
Margit Sebők (1939–2000), Hungarian painter and educator
Kate Seredy (1899–1975), Hungarian-born writer, illustrator
Susan Silas (active since 1980s), artist, writer
Agathe Sorel (born 1935), painter, sculptor
Magdaléna Štrompachová (1919–1988), painter, restorer
Marika Száraz (born 1947), textile artist

T
Margit Tevan (1901–1978), goldsmith

Z
Eva Zeisel (1906–2011), ceramist, designer

-
Hungarian women artists, List of
Artists, List of Hungarian
Artists